Akathiyoor is a census town in Thrissur district  in the state of Kerala, India.

Demographics
At the 2001 India census, Akathiyoor had a population of 5,274 (47% male, 53% female). Akathiyoor had an average literacy rate of 84%, higher than the national average of 59.5%, with 48% of males and 52% of females literate. 10% of the population was under 6 years of age.

References

Cities and towns in Thrissur district